Chelymorpha cribraria is a species of leaf beetle in the family Chrysomelidae. It is found in the Caribbean Sea, Central America, North America, and South America.

References

Further reading

External links

 

Cassidinae
Articles created by Qbugbot
Beetles described in 1775
Taxa named by Johan Christian Fabricius